The 1990 Central Michigan Chippewas football team represented Central Michigan University in the Mid-American Conference (MAC) during the 1990 NCAA Division I-A football season.  In their 13th season under head coach Herb Deromedi, the Chippewas compiled an 8–3–1 record (7–1 against MAC opponents), tied with Toledo for the MAC championship, lost to San Jose State in the California Bowl, and outscored their opponents, 283 to 146.  The team played its home games in Kelly/Shorts Stadium in Mount Pleasant, Michigan, with attendance of 121,270 in six home games.

Led by a strong defense, the team shut out Cincinnati (34–0), Bowling Green (17–0), and Kent State (42–0), and held nine of twelve opponents to fewer than 14 points. On September 22, 1990, the defensive unit set a school record, holding Bowling Green to only two first downs in a 17-0 victory. The following week, the defense set another school record with six interceptions in a 31–7 victory over the Miami Redskins. The team also set a school record with 83 punts forced over the course of the 1990 season.

The team's statistical leaders included quarterback Jeff Bender with 1,978 passing yards, tailback Billy Smith with 1,047 rushing yards, and flanker Ken Ealy with 916 receiving yards. Ealy's 916 receiving yards was a single season school record until 1996 when the record was broken by Reggie Allen. Bender received the team's most valuable player award and also received the MAC's Vern Smith Leadership Award and the MAC Offensive Player of the Year award. Eight Central Michigan players (WR Ken Ealy, OG Paul Jacobson, QB Jeff Bender, RB Billy Smith, DL J.J. Wierenga, ILB Rich Curtiss, DB David Johnson, and DB Ken Strong) received first-team All-MAC honors.  Coach Deromedi received the MAC Coach of the Year award.

Schedule

References

Central Michigan
Central Michigan Chippewas football seasons
Mid-American Conference football champion seasons
Central Michigan Chippewas football